The culture of Qatar is strongly influenced by traditional Bedouin culture, with less acute influence deriving from India, East Africa and elsewhere in the Persian Gulf. The peninsula's harsh climatic conditions compelled its inhabitants to turn to the sea for sustenance. Thus, there is a distinct emphasis placed on the sea in local culture. Literature and folklore themes are often related to sea-based activities.

Oral arts such as poetry and singing were historically more prevalent than figurative art because of the restrictions placed by Islam on depictions of sentient beings; however, certain visual art disciplines such as calligraphy, architecture and textile arts were widely practiced. Figurative arts were gradually assimilated into the country's culture during the oil era.

Abdulrahman bin Hamad bin Jassim bin Hamad Al Thani is Minister of Culture.

Visual arts

Because of Islam's stance on figurative art, paintings and plastic arts played a relatively insignificant role in Qatari culture until the discovery of oil in the mid-20th century. Other visual arts such as calligraphy and architecture were the most historically dominant forms of Islamic visual expression. Calligraphy was most prized in society because of its close connection with Islam. Calligraphy is often used in the design of official state logos, for example, the Qatar National Vision 2030 logo.

Art exhibitions were held under the auspices of the Ministry of Education until 1972, whereupon the state began providing its full support to the art scene. The Qatari Fine Arts Society was established in 1980 with the objective of promoting the works of Qatari artists. Yousef Ahmad is a leading figure of Qatar's art industry and regularly represents the country at international biennials and events. His art work has been displayed internationally.

For the last twenty years, several members of the Al Thani family have led Qatar's interest and involvement into the field of arts and continue to shape the cultural policy of the country. Qatar was revealed to be the world's biggest art buyer in 2011 by The Art Newspaper.

Qatar Museums was established in the early 2000s to build and connect all museums and collections in Qatar. Two major museums lead the institution: the Museum of Islamic Art opened in 2008, and the Mathaf: Arab Museum of Modern Art, opened in Education City by Qatar Foundation in 2010. The National Museum of Qatar has recently joined the Qatar Museums institution when it first opened on 27 March 2019.

When a quartet comprising Saudi Arabia, the UAE, Bahrain and Egypt severed all ties with and imposed a blockade of Qatar on 5 June 2017, Qatari artist Ahmed Al-Maadheed created an illustration known as "Tamim Almajd", which translates to "Tamim the Glorious". The illustration, a simple black and white sketch of Emir Tamim bin Hamad Al Thani containing the text "Tamim Almajd" in the style of Arabic calligraphy, has become symbolic of Qatari nationalism. The image is now displayed prominently on buildings, in media and in art in Qatar.

At the 2022 Doha Forum, Qatar Museum's Chairperson, Sheikha Al Mayassa bint Hamad bin Khalifa Al Thani, revealed plans for a further three museums: The first, the Art Mill, located on the site of a historic flour mill, a centre designed by Alejandro Aravena of Elemental, will accommodate presentation facilities for artistic media and for present day art, as well as spaces for educational activities and internship programs, workrooms, a centre for the cultural industries of Qatar, the Dhow Centre, as well as gardens. The second, the Lusail Museum, designed by architect Jacques Herzog of Herzog & de Meuron, a museum of more than 52,000 square meters will comprise different cultural spaces and accommodate the world's most extensive exhibition of orientalist art. The third newly proposed museum, the Qatar Auto Museum, will feature permanent galleries centered around the automobile and its development in Qatar.

Folklore

Local folk stories were seldom documented, instead being passed down orally from generation to generation. After Qatar began profiting from oil exploration, the tradition of passing down these stories gradually ceased. Government ministries such as the Ministry of Culture and Sports and local universities have made efforts to preserve and transcribe local legends in publications.

Among Qatar's most noted folk heroes are Qatari ibn al-Fuja'a, a 7th-century war poet, and Rahmah ibn Jabir Al Jalhami, an 18th- and 19th-century pirate and transitory leader of Qatar. Recurring themes in Qatari folk tales are djinn, pearl diving, and the sea.

One myth that purportedly originates from Qatar is that of May and Gilan, the latter of whom is said to be progenitor of the sail. According to tradition, in old times, a wealthy man named Ghilan resided in Al Khor. Besides commanding a crew of sailors and fishermen, he owned numerous pearling boats. As time passed, a woman named May who commanded superior number of boats and crewmen emerged as Ghilan's main adversary.

In an incident in which both crews were attempting to harvest the same pearl bed, May taunted Ghilan as her ship raced past his. This incensed Ghilan, who set out to discover a way to best his competitor. While observing a grasshopper, Ghilan took note of how its wings worked, and applied the same principle to his boats, giving rise to the sail. This enabled his boats to travel at higher speeds, allowing him to outpace May's boats to the densest pearl beds. The myth is typically presented in five sequences and is unlike most other known Bedouin stories. According to locals of Al Khor, the myth originated from the Al Muhannadi tribe of Al Khor. The story is not well-known elsewhere in Qatar.

The Lord of the Sea tale is famous in Qatar as well as the rest of the Persian Gulf region. The story revolves around a water djinn in the Persian Gulf named Bū Daryā who terrorizes sailors and pearl divers. It remains a well-known tale among Qatar's older population, particularly those who worked in maritime activities.

Literature

Qatari literature dates back to the 19th century with poets such as Abdul Jalil Al-Tabatabai and Mohammed bin Abdullah bin Uthaymeen. However, due to widespread illiteracy in the region at this time, local written literature dating back to the 19th century is scarce.

The modern literature movement in Qatar began in the 1950s, during the same time as the modern arts movement. This was largely because the increased prosperity from oil extraction activities allowed Qataris to receive formal education, adopt more settled lifestyles and attend higher education institutes abroad in order to hone their creative skills. Other factors involved in triggering a literary revolution were the improved social standing of women, the advent of a national identity, and the introductions of literary organisations, journalism and mass immigration.

Unlike most other forms of art in Qatari society, females have been involved in the literature movement on a similar magnititude to males. Yousef Ni'ma introduced the first two collections of short stories in 1970, entitled Bint Al-Khaleej (Daughter of the Gulf) and Liqa fi Beirut (A Meeting in Bayrut). In the 1970s, much of the early work of females revolved around ritha poems which were published in local newspapers. Kaltham Jaber became the first Qatari woman to publish a collection of short stories, and the first Qatari woman writer to publish a major work when she released her anthology of short stories, dating from 1973 to the year of its publishing, 1978. Entitled "Ania wa Ghabat as-Samt wa at-Taraddud", the main focus of these stories is the desire for Qatari women to have a role in restructuring social norms and cultural conceptions.

In the late 20th and the 21st centuries, novels became popular among Qatari writers. Shu'a' Khalifa and her sister Dalal Khalifa were the first two Qatari novelists to publish their works. They accomplished this feat with the publishing of three separate novels in 1993: al-Ubur ila al-haqiqa (Passage to Truth), written by Shu'a' in 1987, Ahlam al-bahr al-qadima (The Old Dreams of the Sea), written by Shu'a' in 1990 and Usturat al-Insan wa-l-buhayra (The Myth of the Man and the Lake, written by Dalal. Their novels center around social limitations faced by women, and scrutinize long-held social values. Another important theme in their novels is the rapid societal transition experienced by Qatar since the discovery of oil.

Abdulaziz Al-Mahmoud published his maritime novel Al Qursan in August 2011, and it went on to become one of the best-selling books to be released by a Qatari author. By June 2015, twelve Qatari women and eight Qatari men had published a collective total of thirty-nine novels. Novels have proven to be one of the fastest growing categories of literature, with nearly a quarter of all existing Qatari-authored novels being published as recently as 2014. Six new female Qatari writers published novels in 2014. Similar to their predecessors, the main themes in their books are women's role in society and the social transition of Qatar.

Poetry

Poetry has been an integral part of the culture since pre-Islamic times. Qatari ibn al-Fuja'a, a folk hero dating to the seventh-century, was renowned for writing poetry. It was seen as a verbal art which fulfilled essential social functions. Having a renowned poet among its ranks was a source of pride for tribes; it is the primary way in which age-old traditions are passed down generations. Poems composed by females primarily focused on the theme of ritha, to lament. This type of poetry served as an elegy.

Nabati was the primary form of oral poetry. In the nineteenth-century, sheikh Jassim Al Thani composed influential Nabati poems on the political conditions in Qatar. Nabati poems are broadcast on radio and televised in the country.

Music

The folk music of Qatar has a close association with the sea. Songs related to pearl hunting are the most popular genre of male folk music. Each song, varying in rhythm, narrates a different activity of the pearling trip, including spreading the sails, diving, and rowing the ships. Collective singing was an integral part of each pearling trip, and each ship had a designated singer, known locally as al naham.

Ardah, a folkloric dance, is still practiced in Qatar. The dance is performed with two rows of men opposite of one another, each of whom may or may not be wielding a sword, and is accompanied by drums and spoken poetry.

Historically, women primarily sang work songs associated with daily activities such as wheat grinding and cooking. The songs were performed collectively in small groups some pertained to general themes, whereas others were related to specific work processes. Women would also sing when returning pearl ships were sighted. After a sighting was made, they would gather around the seashore where they would clap and sing about the hardships of pearl diving.

Traditional lifestyles
As Qatar is an extremely arid country, the traditional ways of life were confined either to nomadic pastoralism practiced by the Bedouins of the interior and to fishing and pearling, which was engaged in by the relatively settled coastal dwellers. Both fishing and pearling were done mainly using dhows, and the latter activity occasionally employed slaves. Pearling season took place from May to September and the pearls would be exported to Baghdad and elsewhere in Asia. While pearl trading was a lucrative venture for traders and dealers of pearls, the pearlers would receive few of the profits themselves. The main fishing and pearling centers of Qatar throughout its history have been Fuwayrit, Al Huwaila, and Al Bidda.

Bedouin lifestyle was nomadic and consisted of frequent migration, which would come after either a water source had been used up or a grazing site was exhausted. However, in Qatar, most Bedouins would only wander during the winter, as it was too hot to do so during the summer; thus, Qatar was mainly a winter grazing ground for Bedouins from the eastern region of the Arabian Peninsula. Goats and camels were the main livelihoods of Bedouins, with products from the former being used in trade and for sustenance and with camels being used as a means of transportation as well as a source of milk. Every tribe would have its own region, called dirah in Arabic, but if the resources in their dirah had become depleted, then the tribe would be forced to migrate to another tribe's dirah, potentially provoking conflicts.

In the winter when tribes wandered through Qatar, it was unusual for a tribe to remain at one location for a period exceeding ten days. Generally, the average daily distance traveled by Bedouins was not very long, so as to preserve energy and resources. Although the traveling speed would be greatly hastened in cases of inclement weather or far-away distances between one pastureland to another. By and large, it was easier for Bedouin tribes to thrive during the winter months, so long as the rains arrived and there was no in-fighting. Women were responsible for making clothing, taking care of children and preparing food, one popular dish being leben, which comprises fermented milk. Men, on the other hand, would frequently go hunting with hawks and dogs during the winter months.

Leaders of Bedouin tribes, known as sheikhs, often gained their positions by proving themselves to be generous and competent rulers. It was expected of them to provide charity to the poorer members of the tribe should the need arise. The sheikh's wife would be expected to help solve complaints brought to her by the female members of the tribe. Bedouins often lived very modestly, lacking a consistent source of income. Nonetheless, due to the cooperation and charity between tribe members, it was rare that one would go hungry except during exceptionally long droughts. Bedouins of all classes had a reputation for being very hospitable towards guests. After the discovery of oil in Qatar, most Qataris moved to urban areas and the Bedouin way of life gradually disappeared. Only a few tribes in Qatar continue this lifestyle.

Sports

Football is the most popular sport in regard to the player base. Additionally, athletics, basketball, handball, volleyball, camel racing, horse racing, cricket and swimming are widely practiced. There are currently 11 multi-sports clubs in the country, and 7 single-sports clubs.

Prior to the introduction of football, traditional games played were al dahroi, al sabbah, and taq taq taqiyyah for boys, and al kunatb, al laqfah and nat al habl for girls. Variations of a family of board games known as mancala were played in previous decades. Two of the most popular board games were a’ailah and al haluwsah. Other traditional sports practiced in the country include falconry, camel racing and hunting.

Historically camel racing was a tradition among the Bedouin tribes of Qatar and would be performed on special occasions such as weddings. It was not until 1972, one year after Qatar's independence, that camel racing was practiced on a professional level. Typically, camel racing season takes place from September to March. Approximately 22,000 racing camels are used in competitions which are mainly held at the country's primary camel racing venue, the Al-Shahaniya Camel Racetrack. The average distance of such races is usually 4 to 8 km depending on the conditions of the camels being raced.

Falconry is widely practiced by Qataris. The only falconry association is Al Gannas, which was founded in 2008 in the Katara Cultural Village and which hosts the Annual Falconry Festival. Hunting season extends from October to April. Prices of falcons can be extremely high, being as expensive as QR 1 million. Saluki dogs are also used for hunting in the desert primarily because of their great speeds. Their main prey in the desert are gazelles and rabbits.

Qatar hosted the 2022 FIFA World Cup and is the first Arab nation to host the FIFA World Cup.

Food and drink

As Qatar follows Shariah religious law, alcohol and pork products cannot be brought into the country.

Qatari cuisine reflects traditional Arab and Levantine cuisine. It is also heavily influenced by Iranian and Indian cuisine. Seafood and dates are staple food items.

The main dishes that are considered to be traditional Qatari food, include:
 Machbous (kabsa), which is rice that is cooked with Arabic spices, served with chicken, lamb, or fish. Machbous is mainly served with lamb during big celebrations, and any type of gatherings to show generosity.
 Mathruba, which is rice beaten with cardamom, milk, butter, and any choice of meat, until it turns into porridge form.
 Thareed, consists of bread soaked in vegetable, spices, and chicken/lamb stew. It is specifically served everyday during Ramadan, along with Harees.
 Harees, meat beaten with boiled ground wheat, until it turns into porridge form, to the consistency desired.
 Balaleet, is a sweet and savory dish, that is usually eaten for breakfast or as a dessert, which includes vermicelli cooked with sugar, rose water, cardamom, and saffron, and topped with omelet eggs.

Dress

Clothing laws punish and forbid the wearing of revealing or indecent clothes. The dressing-code law is enforced by a government body called "Al-Adheed". In 2012, a Qatari NGO organized a campaign of "public decency" after they deemed the government to be too lax in monitoring the wearing of revealing clothes; defining the latter as "not covering shoulders and knees, tight or transparent clothes". The campaign targets foreigners who constitute the majority of Qatar's population.

Qatari men wear thawbs (a long white shirt) over loose pants. They also wear a loose headdress, a ghutra, which comes in white or red. Around the ghutra is a black rope called agal, which holds it in place.

Qatari women generally wear customary dresses that include “long black robes” and black head cover hijab, locally called bo'shiya. However, the more traditional Sunni Muslim clothing for women are the black colored body covering known as the abayah together with the black scarf used for covering their heads known as the shayla. A burqa is sometimes worn to conceal their face.

It is believed that Qatari women began using face masks in the 19th century amid substantial immigration. As they had no practical ways of concealing their faces from foreigners, they began wearing the same type of face mask as their Persian counterparts.

Language 

The legitimate language spoken in Qatar is Arabic. However, since more than half of Qatar's population are expats and migrants, English is also commonly spoken at public places especially at shops and restaurants.

The table below includes basic Arabic words:

Religion 

The official religion practiced in Qatar is Islam.

Holidays

Qatar's weekends are Friday and Saturday. Qatar National Day was changed from 3 September to 18 December in 2008. Notable holidays in the country are listed below:

Media

There are currently seven newspapers in circulation in Qatar, with four being published in Arabic and three being published in English. Additionally, there are nine magazines.

All radio programmes from Qatar are state-owned and are amalgamated as the Qatar Broadcasting Service. Radio broadcasting in the country began in June 1968 and English transmissions started in December 1971 in order to accommodate the increasing non-Arabic speaking expat community. The QBS currently features radio stations in English, Arabic, French and Urdu.

Al Jazeera, currently Qatar's largest television network, was founded in 1996 and has since become the foundation of the media sector. Initially launched as an Arabic news and current affairs satellite TV channel, Al Jazeera has since expanded into a network with several outlets, including the internet and specialty TV channels in multiple languages. The 'Al Jazeera effect' refers to the global impact of the Al Jazeera Media Network, particularly on the politics of the Arab world.

Cinema

Television 
The multinational media conglomerate Al Jazeera Media Network is based in Doha with its wide variety of channels of which Al Jazeera Arabic, Al Jazeera English, Al Jazeera Documentary Channel, Al Jazeera Mubasher, beIN Sports Arabia and AlrayyanTV with other operations are based in the TV Roundabout in the city.

Terrestrial television
Terrestrial television stations now available on Nilesat include:

Pay television
 Teledunet
 Mozaic TV
 MyHD
 Mivo TV
 Sky (Qatar, UAE, KSA, Kuwait, Oman and Iran only, Pakistan, Palestine, Syria and Iraq)

Radio 
Doha has a variety of radio stations, some of which include:

FM radio
 89.6 - Radio Mirchi one 
 90.8 – QBS Arabic
 91.7 – Radio Suno
 92.0 – MBC FM
 92.6 – Radio Sawa Gulf
 93.7 – QF Radio
 94.0 – Oryx FM French
 94.3 - Qabayan FM 
 97.5 – QBS English
 98.6 - Radio Malayalam
 99.6 – Radio Monte Carlo
 100.3 – Panorama FM
 100.8 – Sout al Khaleej
 101.0 -- Sindo Trijaya FM
 102.0 – Fox News Talk
 102.2 -- Sonora FM
 103.4 – Quran Kareem Radio
 104.6 -- Delta FM 
 106.3 - Radio Olive jiyo bindas
 107.0 - QBS Urdu 

DAB radio
 10B Arabic Multiplex
 C221 – QBS Arabic
 C222 – QF Radio More
 C223 – MBC FM
 C224 – Radio Sawa Gulf
 C225 – QF Radio
 C226 – Oryx FM French
 C227 – QBS English
 C228 – Radio Monte Carlo
 C229 – BBC Arabic Service
 C230 – Panorama FM
 C231 – Sout al Khaleej
 C232 – Fox News Talk
 C233 – Quran Kareem Radio
 C234 – BBC World Service

DAB radio
 10C Indonesian Multiplex
 C235 – Sonora FM
 C236 – Delta FM
 C237 – Sindo Trijaya FM

See also
Ministry of Culture and Sports (Qatar)
ministry of culture and sports  (Qatar)

References

Qatari culture
Qatar